Grozny State Oil Technical University is the oldest oil university in Russia. It was founded in 1920 as the Higher Petroleum Technical School, with eight divisions, named after M.D. Millionshikov. Since the Soviet Era, it has been known informally as Groznensky neftyanoi (Russian: Грозненский нефтяной). The university has its own recreation center on the Black Sea and a rest house on the Caspian Sea.

History
The university started the first academic year On August 1, 1920, which brought the first 265 students. In 1942, the university was evacuated to Kokand, Uzbekistan due to the Great Patriotic War and began operating in Grozny again in 1943.

In 1973, the university was named after its eminent alumnus .

The university premises were destroyed twice during two war conflicts in Chechnya (1991–2000). A large percentage of the student body and faculty were killed. Rebuilding the main facilities began in 2007 under the "Federal Target Programme". In 2011, university received the official status of the Technical University of GSTU.

Accommodation
All foreign students can stay in student hostels in rooms for two to three people. Rooms are equipped with the necessary furniture and bedding. The building of student halls is situated within three km from the main building of the university. It is a five-story building and each story has two laundry rooms and one study room. There is shared kitchen for several rooms.

There are two kinds of rooms:
 Double rooms with a balcony, kitchen, private WC and shower;
 Suite-style rooms with different categories such as double and triple rooms with shower, WC and kitchen shared with another room.

Institutes and faculties

Institute of Oil and Gas
The Institute of Oil and Gas is the university's largest department, created in 2017 through the merger of three faculties, Field Geological, Oil Mechanical, and Oil Technological. In 2018, the institute was named after the academician Salambek Khadzhiev. The institute is located in academic building #1 in the city of Grozny.

There are 10 departments, two of which are university-wide:

 General and Inorganic Chemistry
 Applied Mechanics and Engineering Graphics
 Applied Geology
 Applied Geophysics and Geoinformatics
 Development and Operation of Oil and Gas Fields
 Technological Machines and Equipment
 Applied Chemistry of Oil and Gas
 Health Safety
 Environmental and Nature Management
 Technology of Foodstuffs and Fermentation Industry

Institute of Construction, Architecture and Design
The institute is located in the historic center of the city of Grozny in academic building No 2. The history of the Institute dates back to 1950 when the Construction Department was opened.

It is the Chechen Republic's only higher educational establishment to prepare civil engineers as of December 2021. It is claimed that the institute's alumni are involved in 90% of structures built in the Chechen Republic. Both undergraduate and postgraduate degrees are offered in Russian. There are 52 teachers, including nine doctors of science and 26 candidates of science.

There are five departments:

 Construction Technology
 Building Structures
 Geodesy and Land Cadaster
 Survey, Property Management and Heat and Gas Supply
 Architecture

Notable alumni
Dena Bataev, Director of Kh.Ibragimov Complex Institute of the Russian Academy of Sciences.

Institute of Applied Information Technologies
The institute is located in the main building of the university just across the Heart of Chechnya's Central Mosque. The institute was founded in 2000. There are 10 doctors of science and 29 candidates in sciences. Both undergraduate and postgraduate degrees are offered here in Russian.

There are four departments:

 Informatics and Computer Engineering.
 Information Technology.
 Information Management System in Economics.
 Telecommunications Network and Switching System.

Notable alumni
 Magomed Selimkhanov, Deputy of the State Duma of the Federal Assembly of the Russian Federation
 Suliman Masaev, Deputy CEO of Rosseti, Northern Caucasus
 Salambek Abdulazimov, Prorector for IT of Chechen State University

Institute of Digital Economy and Technological Entrepreneurship
The institute is located in academic building No 1. The Institute traces its history to 2016 when the Public Administration Faculty was founded. In 2019, it was reformed into its current structure. There are 10 doctors of sciences and 60 candidates in sciences. Both undergraduate and postgraduate degrees are offered here in Russian.

There are eight departments:

 Information Systems in Economics
 Information Law and Jurisprudence
 Business and Innovation Management
 Economics and Enterprise Management
 General Humanitarian Disciplines
 Interfaculty Language Department
 Physical Education
 Economic Theory and Public Administration

References

Universities in Russia
Education in Chechnya
1920 establishments in Russia